Singer Vinger is an Estonian punk rock band. It was founded in 1985, before that being named Pära Trust (Backside trust, 1979–83), Turist (Tourist, 1983–85) and Aken (Window) among others; the name Singer Vinger was picked by authorities, because "Turist" was deemed inappropriate by the Soviet Estonian ministry of culture. The leader, main songwriter and singer is and has been throughout the name changes Hardi Volmer. Main themes in band's songs are social-critic irony and humour.

Members
Hardi Volmer – vocals
Roald Jürlau – guitar, back vocal
Mihkel Raud – guitar
Rein Joasoo – drums
Avo Ulvik – keyboards (until 2011)
Ülo Krigul – keyboards (since 2011)
Jaanus Raudkats – bass (1990, 1995 to 1999)
Eerik Olle – bass

Turist
Hardi Volmer – vocals
Veljo Vingissar (Vink) – vocals, guitar
Roald Jürlau (Jürilaud) – guitar
Avo Ulvik (Ulvaeus) – keyboards
Andrus Kerstenbeck (Kersta) – drums (until 04.1985)
Rein Joasoo – drums (since 04.1985)
Eerik Olle – bass
Villu Veski – keyboards, saxophone

Pära Trust
Jaak Arro (Jekabs) – vocals (until 02.1982)
Veljo Vingissar (Vink) – guitar
Jüri Kermik – guitar (until 09.1981)
Roald Jürlau (Rollo) – guitar (since 09.1981)
Hardi Volmer – drums (until 02.1982), vocals (since 02.1982)
Andrus Kerstenbeck (Kersta) – drums (since 02.1982)
Eerik Olle – bass

Albums
Singer Vinger (1988)
Jää jumalaga puberteet (1989)
Reanimatsioon (1995)
Amneesia (1996)
Troinoi (2000)
Ärq ei lääq (2003)
Eesti Kullafond: Singer Vinger (2005)
20 aastat singumist ja vingumist  (2006)
Suu laulab, Süda läigib  (2012)

References

Estonian punk rock groups
Musical groups established in 1986
1986 establishments in the Soviet Union
Soviet punk rock groups